Paul Simon is an American singer-songwriter who has released twelve solo studio albums, one soundtrack, three live albums, and numerous compilations and box sets. Simon began his career with the single "Hey,no" alongside Art Garfunkel in 1957; they subsequently regrouped in 1964 to form Simon & Garfunkel. Simon & Garfunkel recorded five albums together,

This list comprises both his solo work, songs he has been featured on, songs recorded with Art Garfunkel, and songs released in the 1950s–60s under pseudonyms. It contains his available recorded material, including alternate versions of songs, which are listed separately, and well-known unreleased material.

Songs

Notes

References

External links
 Official site

Simon, Paul
Paul Simon songs